Patricia Hernández may refer to:

 Patricia Hernández (basketball) (born 1970), Spanish basketball player
 Patricia Hernández (politician) (born 1980), Spanish politician